is a Japanese politician of the Democratic Party of Japan and a member of the House of Representatives in the Diet (national legislature). A native of Takamatsu, Kagawa and graduate of Ritsumeikan University, he was elected to the House of Representatives for the first time in 2003. As a member of the Diet, he represents the 11th District of Aichi prefecture, which includes the cities of Toyota and Miyoshi.

References

External links 
 Official website in Japanese.

Members of the House of Representatives from Aichi Prefecture
Toyota people
Ritsumeikan University alumni
Politicians from Kagawa Prefecture
1965 births
Living people
Democratic Party of Japan politicians
21st-century Japanese politicians
People from Takamatsu, Kagawa